= Ebrahimabad-e Beyg Zadeh =

- Location in Iran
- Coordinates: 39°37′36″N 47°57′07″E
- Country: Iran
- Province: Ardabil Province
- Time zone: UTC+3:30 (IRST)
  - Summer (DST): UTC+4:30 (IRDT)

Ebrahimabad-e Beyg Zadeh is a village in the Ardabil Province of Iran near the border with Azerbaijan.
